Donald George Stait (1928–2007) was an Australian rugby league footballer who played in the 1950s.

Background
Stait was born in Portland, New South Wales.

Playing career
Stait played with Western Suburbs for three seasons between 1950 and 1952. He played in a Grand Final for Wests in his first season when the team was defeated by South Sydney Rabbitohs in the 1950 Grand Final. 

He later moved to Newtown for another three seasons between 1954 and 1956. He appeared in two losing Grand Finals with Newtown in 1954 and 1955. 

Stait retired after the 1956 season.

Stait died on 18 June 2007, at Bronte, New South Wales aged 79.

References

1928 births
2007 deaths
Australian rugby league players
Newtown Jets players
Rugby league props
Rugby league players from New South Wales
Country New South Wales rugby league team players
Western Suburbs Magpies players